Whanganui Island is the largest of a small group of islands at the entrance to Coromandel harbour in the Hauraki Gulf, off the coast of New Zealand's North Island.

The island, which is privately owned, is
 in area. Much of it is farmed, but there are some forested areas.

Early history

The ancient pa of Horokino (Herekino) situated at Arapaoa Bay (Homestead Bay) was captured by the Tainui from the original inhabitants, the Ngati Huarere, and was one of several dotted around the perimeter of the Coromandel Harbour, then known as the Waiau.

Modern history

The geographic naming by both Maori and Pakeha has been subject to many changes over the history of the island and this makes the study of its history confusing.

The historian A. V. Piesse made a study of the names and seems to have arrived at a suitable summary. "The island is separated from the mainland by a narrow passage known as Whenuakura.The ancient name for the Island was Poroporo (according to Church Missionary Society catechist James Preece), later referred to by early settlers as Arapaoa, and then finally Whanganui Island (although originally as Wanganui Island).
Also the Southernmost Point of the Island, now called Tawhiti Point was originally named Poroporo. Tawhiti Point was the name first used for the Northern end of Tawhiti (Woolshed) Bay, which is now called Rodney Point. The island was variously also named Beesons Island, Parker Island and Waiou.

American William Webster established a shipbuilding and trading enterprise on the island in 1836. He owned the island until the signing of the Treaty of Waitangi, when he lost legal title to the island as all titles passed to the British crown.

During the period of William Webster John Logan Campbell spent a period of time on Whanganui Island. There is a certain amount of confusion about where he stayed. Some say he lived at Timber (Woolshed) Bay and some say he stayed at the home at Arapaoa Bay. There was a good deal of shipbuilding activity in Timber (Woolshed) Bay and this was of primary interest to Campbell so it was possible that he stayed there. However Piesse for one includes a sketch of Campbell's "base" in his book and Campbell writes about his "Stay at Herekino" in his book "Poenamo"

Town of Coromandel
Whanganui Island was the original site for the new Town of Coromandel. Plans were drawn up and sold in New Zealand and Britain. 
 and sections were sold. The issue to the new owners was that the plan implied flattish land but the land was far from flat. There was also no suitable permanent source of fresh water. .The new owners abandoned their land and eventually the Crown bought all but two of the sections and helped the Settlers establish themselves in the mainland settlement of Kapanga (the new Coromandel Town )

Woolshed Bay on the protected southern shore is a popular overnight mooring spot for cruising from Auckland.

See also 
 List of islands of New Zealand

References

Thames-Coromandel District
Islands of Waikato